Mun Gyeong-suk (born 5 February 1945) is a South Korean volleyball player. She competed at the 1964 Summer Olympics and the 1968 Summer Olympics.

References

1945 births
Living people
South Korean women's volleyball players
Olympic volleyball players of South Korea
Volleyball players at the 1964 Summer Olympics
Volleyball players at the 1968 Summer Olympics
Place of birth missing (living people)
Asian Games medalists in volleyball
Volleyball players at the 1966 Asian Games
Medalists at the 1966 Asian Games
Asian Games silver medalists for South Korea